Jonestown: The Life and Death of Peoples Temple, is a 2006 documentary film made by Firelight Media, produced and directed by Stanley Nelson. The documentary reveals new footage of the incidents surrounding the Peoples Temple and its leader Jim Jones who led over 900 members of his religious group to a settlement in Guyana called Jonestown, where he orchestrated a mass suicide with poisoned Flavor Aid, in November 1978. It is in the form of a narrative with interviews with former Temple members, Jonestown survivors, and people who knew Jones.

Release
The film premiered at the 2006 Tribeca Film Festival where it received the Outstanding Achievement in Documentary award, and was broadcast nationally on Monday, April 9, 2007, on PBS's documentary program "American Experience". The DVD release contains a number of scenes and interviews not in the on-air program.

Awards
 Golden Gate Award for Best Bay Area Feature Documentary, San Francisco International Film Festival
 Outstanding Achievement in Documentary, 2006 Tribeca Film Festival
 Nominee, 2006 International Documentary Association Awards

References

External links
 
 
 
 Official Trailer on Apple.com/Trailers with HighDefinition version

Reviews
 Doomsday dream believer, San Francisco Bay Guardian, Cheryl Eddy, 2006
 Compilation of Reviews, Rotten Tomatoes, 2006
 Review, New York Times, Stephen Holden, 2006
Documentary on Tragic Cult Deserves Huge Following, New York Post, Kyle Smith, October 20, 2006
 Documentary offers rare film of Jim Jones, San Francisco Chronicle, G. Allen Johnson, November 3, 2006
 Another look at Jonestown, The Washington Post, June 2006
 Portrait of infamous cult's rise and fall, Star Ledger, New Jersey, October 21, 2006, Stephen Whitty

2006 films
2006 documentary films
American documentary films
American Experience
Documentary films about disasters
Documentary films about religion
Films shot in Guyana
Works about Jonestown
Leo Ryan
Films set in Guyana
Films directed by Stanley Nelson Jr.
Documentary films about suicide
2000s English-language films
Films about cults
2000s American films